The Pecos River High Bridge carries the Union Pacific Railroad across the Pecos River gorge and is the second high-level crossing on this site.

History

The first Pecos River Bridge, designed by SP chief engineer Julius Kruttschnitt, was built by the Phoenix Bridge Company and completed in 1892. After strengthening and reinforcement in 1910 and again in 1929 which almost doubled its weight, it remained in place until 1949, five years after its replacement. The second Pecos River High Bridge, was completed by the Southern Pacific Railroad on December 8, 1944.

It was designed by Modjeski and Masters of Harrisburg, Pennsylvania, with foundations constructed by Brown and Root of Houston and trusses fabricated by Bethlehem Steel Company of Chicago. Because of material rationing during World War II, War Production Board approval was required before proceeding with fabrication.

Route
In addition to freight trains of the Union Pacific (which merged with the Southern Pacific in 1996), this bridge carries Amtrak's Sunset Limited and Texas Eagle between its stations in Sanderson and Del Rio.

See also
List of bridges documented by the Historic American Engineering Record in Texas
List of bridges in the United States by height
Texas and New Orleans Railroad

References

External links

Railroad bridges in Texas
Southern Pacific Railroad
Union Pacific Railroad bridges
Buildings and structures in Val Verde County, Texas
Bridges completed in 1944
Transportation in Val Verde County, Texas
Historic American Engineering Record in Texas
Steel bridges in the United States